is the manga counterpart to Sunrise's My-Otome series, following a storyline which is different from that of the anime. It is authored by Hajime Yatate (original creator), Tatsuhito Higuchi (scenario), Hiroyuki Yoshino (scenario) and Kenetsu Satō (art). During its 44-chapter run, it was published in Akita Shoten's Shōnen Champion, with its first publication in August 2005, two months prior to the release of the anime. It's a semi-fusion of the Mai-Hime anime and manga (e.g. Haruka's element, and Shizuru's knowledge of her own naginata-wielding 'dark twin' as well as Alyssa's sisterly relationship with Natsuki Kruger and the apparent romantic relationship between Viola and the latter).

In addition, there is a derivative chapter called Mai Otome Super H, centered on an onsen visit. It was published in the Champion RED magazine. As the title suggests, it has hentai content. However, it is a canonical work by the original manga artist and the content is not as explicit as most H-Doujinshi. It takes place between chapters 12 and 13, but no mention is made in the main plot.

It's not connected to the new My-Otome Zwei manga, which follows the anime's plot more closely.

A continuation of the original manga was released and named My-Otome Arashi, which introduces Archduke Nagi's younger twin sister (disguised as a man) Arashi who has purchased Garderobe and all of its students after the campus incurred repair debts from the end of the original manga. During Sergay's coup turning the school into a nightclub despite the fact that Garderobe is the single most vital element to all the nations of Earl by supplying Otomes (they have supposedly been abandoned by the world).

Story
One night in the Windbloom Kingdom, Princess Mashiro Blan de Windbloom is assassinated in her sleep. Some days later, the main character, an anonymous boy, arrives in Wind City, capital of Windbloom. Using a gem passed down from his mother, he takes up the identity of Mashiro and joins Garderobe. The story follows his experiences in Garderobe and later his battles against those who would seek to destabilize the peace.

Nomenclature
 Otome, officially 乙-type HiME - 乙-type Highly-advanced Materializing Equipment. A female virgin who serves as a bodyguard and servant to an important political figure, they have the power to materialize special robes and weapons known as Elements because of special nanomachines. As with Hime in My-HiME otome is a pun as in Japanese it can mean maiden or virgin which is appropriate since all Otome need to be virgins to retain their powers, as the nanomachines are destroyed upon contact with a chemical found in sperm.
 GEM - Generable (sic) Enigmatic Matrix, as explained in Chapters 1 and 2. The source of an Otome's power.
 Element - The weapon of an Otome, examples include Shizuru's whip like katana and Arika's blue crystal lance.
 SLAVE - A creature summoned by a contract using one's own blood. The life force of a SLAVE is connected to that of the summoner, meaning if the slave is killed the owner perishes along with it much like the Key and Child bond in My-HiME.
 REM - Reinforcing (sic) Enigmatic Matrix. A Schwarz-modified version of Garderobe's GEM. Used by Midori. It appears to allow the user access to their own Robe, as opposed to invisibly enhancing the user like the anime's does, although since Midori's is the only one seen, no generalization of its abilities can be made. Midori's REM allows her to draw on the power of her minions. Unlike the anime, Yohko does not eventually upgrade it to have infinite duration. Compatible with Garderobe's nanomachines, allowing Arika to briefly Materialize by using it in Chapters 36 and 37.
 MAID - Multi-purpose Assistant-type Independent Droid. A series of robots based on Miyu that are being developed in Aries. They are "perfect and flawless". No anime equivalent exists.
 Beautiful Power (Miryoku) - A form of energy that powers special attacks by the Otome. Some Otomes have special charge-up attacks such as Arika's 'Bolt from the Blue', Nao's 'Bloody Stripe Circus', and Natsuki's 'Howling Silver Wolf' but are much different from Miryoku. The special attacks an Otome use that are powered by this are unique to each and usually one Otome only has one, but more powerful Otomes like Arika and Nina have multiple.
 Butou - Formal ceremonial battles between Otome. Students may also engage in them. All of these special battles must be approved first, as they are subject to strict rules and procedures.

Characters

Volume list

References 

Akita Shoten manga
Sunrise (company)
My-HiME Project
 3
Shōnen manga